Erie v. Pap's A. M., 529 U.S. 277 (2000), was a landmark decision by the Supreme Court of the United States regarding nude dancing as free speech. The court held that an ordinance banning public nudity did not violate the operator of a totally nude entertainment establishment's constitutional right to free speech.

Prior history
On September 28, 1994, the city council of Erie, Pennsylvania, enacted Ordinance 75-1994, a public indecency ordinance that makes it a summary offense to knowingly or intentionally appear in public in a "state of nudity." The respondent, Pap's, a Pennsylvania corporation, operated an establishment in Erie known as "Kandyland" that featured totally nude erotic dancing performed by women. To comply with the ordinance, these dancers would need to wear, at a minimum, pasties and a G-string. On October 14, 1994, two days after the ordinance went into effect, Pap's filed a complaint against the city of Erie, the mayor (Joyce Savacchio), city solicitor (Gregory A. Karle), and members of the city council, seeking declaratory relief and a permanent injunction against the enforcement of the ordinance.

The Court of Common Pleas struck down the ordinance as unconstitutional, but the Commonwealth Court reversed the decision. The Pennsylvania Supreme Court in turn reversed the Commonwealth Court, finding that the ordinance's public nudity section was an unconstitutional violation of Pap's First Amendment rights. Certiorari was granted on appeal from the State Supreme Court.

Case

Mootness
The Court proceeded to the merits despite a possible mootness issue.  While the case was pending, Pap's A.M. went out of business, meaning that no concrete private rights were left to litigate.  Despite going out of business, the Supreme Court still proceeded to decide the case on the merits because 1) the City of Erie was suffering an "ongoing injury" and 2) Pap's was still incorporated and could potentially go back into business.

Rules of law
The Court found the following rules of law to apply:

Being in a state of nudity is not an inherently expressive condition. Totally nude erotic dancing is expressive conduct, although it falls only within the outer ambit of the protection of the First Amendment to the United States Constitution.
Government restrictions on public nudity that ban all public nudity should be evaluated under the framework set forth in United States v. O'Brien for content-neutral restrictions on symbolic speech.
While the doctrinal theories behind incidental burdens and secondary effects are, of course, not identical, there is nothing objectionable about a city passing a general ordinance to ban public nudity, even though such a ban may place incidental burdens on some protected speech, and at the same time recognizing that one specific occurrence of public nudity, nude erotic dancing, is particularly problematic because it produces harmful secondary effects.
For purposes of analysis under the First Amendment to the United States Constitution, even if a regulation has an incidental effect on some speakers or messages but not others, the regulation is content neutral if it can be justified without reference to the content of the expression.

Test
After determining that the ordinance was content neutral, the Court then applied the O'Brien test. The first factor of the O'Brien test for evaluating restrictions on symbolic speech is whether the government regulation is within the constitutional power of the government to enact. The second factor of the O'Brien test for evaluating restrictions on symbolic speech is whether the regulation furthers an important or substantial government interest. The third O'Brien factor is that the government interest must be unrelated to the suppression of free expression. The fourth and final O'Brien factor is that the restriction be no greater than is essential to the furtherance of the government interest.

The court found that the ordinance met all four factors of the O'Brien test, and that a "least restrictive means" analysis was not necessary. The Court reversed the decision of the Pennsylvania Supreme Court, and found the ordinance to be constitutional.

Aftermath
The effects of this case reach beyond simple restriction of nudity. The majority opinion noted: 
The government generally has a freer hand in restricting expressive conduct than it has in restricting the written or spoken word.

Concurrence
Justice Scalia, joined by  Justice Thomas, agreed that the Pennsylvania Supreme Court's decision must be reversed, but disagreed with the mode of analysis that should be applied.

See also
 List of United States Supreme Court cases, volume 529
 List of United States Supreme Court cases
 Lists of United States Supreme Court cases by volume
 United States v. O'Brien
 Tinker v. Des Moines

References

External links
 

United States Supreme Court cases
United States Free Speech Clause case law
1994 in United States case law
2000 in United States case law
History of Erie, Pennsylvania
Legal history of Pennsylvania
2000 in Pennsylvania
Strip clubs
United States Supreme Court cases of the Rehnquist Court